The Noise Abatement Society is a UK company with the charitable aims of raising awareness of, and finding solutions to, noise pollution.
The Noise Abatement Society was established by John Connell in 1959. John Connell lobbied and got the Noise Abatement Act passed through Parliament in 1960. He was awarded an OBE for his efforts for the Society in 1991.

Over the years it has campaigned for the reduction of unnecessary noise from various sources, co-developed international soundscape standards, conducted research and assisted those who suffer from unreasonable noise, for example providing a telephone helpline.

References

External links

British companies established in 1959
Noise pollution